Sapthaswarangal is a 1974 Indian Malayalam-language film, directed by Baby and produced by M. S. Narayanan. The film stars Srividya, Raghavan, Adoor Bhasi and Thikkurissy Sukumaran Nair. The film had musical score by V. Dakshinamoorthy.

Cast

Raghavan as Ajayan
Srividya as Saraswathi
Sujatha
Adoor Bhasi
Thikkurissy Sukumaran Nair
Jose Prakash
Sankaradi
T. R. Omana
Paul Vengola
Rani Chandra
Kaduvakulam Antony
Kunchan

Soundtrack
The music was composed by V. Dakshinamoorthy and the lyrics were written by Sreekumaran Thampi.

References

External links
 

1974 films
1970s Malayalam-language films
Films directed by Baby (director)